The 1921–22 season was the 24th in the history of the Southern League. As in the previous season, the league was split into two sections, one for English clubs and one for Welsh clubs. Plymouth Argyle reserves won the English section, whilst Ebbw Vale won the Welsh section. Plymouth Argyle reserves were declared champions after defeating Ebbw Vale 3-0 in a championship play-off. Pontypridd and Bath City were the only two Southern League clubs to apply for election to the Football League, though neither was successful.

At the end of the season Gillingham reserves and Charlton Athletic reserves both left the league.

English section

A total of 19 teams contest the division, including ten sides from previous season and nine new teams, seven of which were reserve teams.

Newly elected teams:
 Bath City
 Guildford United
 Bristol City II
 Bristol Rovers II
 Charlton Athletic II
 Exeter City II
 Plymouth Argyle II
 Southend United II
 Swindon Town II

Welsh section

A total of 9 teams contest the division, including nine sides from previous season and one new team.

Newly elected teams:
 Swansea Town II

Football League election
In addition to the two clubs finishing bottom of Football League Third Division South, three non-League clubs joined the election process, of which two were from the Southern League. However, both League clubs were re-elected.

References

1921-22
1921–22 in English football leagues
1921–22 in Welsh football